The Electoral district of Franklin was a single-member electoral district of the Tasmanian House of Assembly. It covered all of southern and southwestern Tasmania, and its main population centre was the town of Franklin in Tasmania's Huon Valley. Other centres included Castle Forbes Bay, Geeveston, Dover and Southport.

The seat was created ahead of the Assembly's first election held in 1856, and was abolished when the Tasmanian parliament adopted the Hare-Clark electoral model in 1909.

Members for Franklin

References
 
 
 Parliament of Tasmania (2006). The Parliament of Tasmania from 1956

Franklin
1856 establishments in Australia
1909 disestablishments in Australia